Otto Gordziałkowski (16 November 1898 – 28 January 1994) was a Polish rower. He competed in the men's eight event at the 1928 Summer Olympics.

References

External links
 

1898 births
1994 deaths
Rowers from Saint Petersburg
People from Sankt-Peterburgsky Uyezd
People from the Russian Empire of Polish descent
Polish male rowers
Olympic rowers of Poland
Rowers at the 1928 Summer Olympics
World War II prisoners of war held by Germany
Polish military personnel of World War II